The Charlotte Checkers were a minor league professional ice hockey team based in Charlotte, North Carolina. The team began as the Baltimore Clippers in 1954, playing in the Eastern Hockey League. When the arena in Baltimore burned down, the team briefly played as the Charlotte Rebels, before permanently relocating to the Charlotte Coliseum in 1956, becoming the Charlotte Clippers. The team was renamed the Checkers in 1960, and played its final four seasons in the Southern Hockey League, before folding in 1977. The Clippers/Checkers franchise won five playoff championships in its existence, and were the first team to be based in the Southeast United States.

Baltimore Clippers, 1954–1956

The Baltimore Clippers began play in the Eastern Hockey League during the 1954–55 season, with Andy Brown as coach. Herve Lalonde led the team, scoring 22 goals, and 50 assists, winning the John Carlin Trophy, as the league's top scorer. In the playoffs, Baltimore defeated the Clinton Comets 3 games to 1 in the first round, but lost the finals in four straight games  to the Washington Lions. On January 23, 1956, midway through the Clippers' second season, their home arena, Carlin's Iceland, burned down.

Charlotte Rebels, 1956
Without an arena, the Clippers searched for a temporary home to finish the season. Local businessmen in Charlotte offered the one-year-old Charlotte Coliseum as a temporary site. The Baltimore Clippers played six of their remaining 12 games in Charlotte, using the name Rebels. The first professional hockey game in Charlotte was played on January 30, 1956, attended by 10,363 fans, with approximately 3,000 more unable to find a ticket. The Rebels lost the game 6–2, to the New Haven Blades. The six games played in Charlotte by the Rebels drew more than 40,000 fans. By comparison, the Clippers typically drew 2,000 fans per game in Baltimore. The combined record of the Clippers and Rebels was 47 points for fifth place, missing the playoffs.

Charlotte Clippers, 1956–1960

Buoyed by the Rebels' strong attendance figures in Charlotte, owner Charles Rock chose to move the team there full-time for the following season as the Charlotte Clippers. In the 1956–57 season, the Clippers earned 101 points, to finish first place, and win the Walker Cup as regular season champions. The season included a winning streak of 21 games before the playoffs, and the team earning the nickname, "Dixie Dandies." Al O'Hearn lead the league in scoring with 46 goals, 71 assists, and 117 points, to win the John Carlin Trophy. In the playoffs, Charlotte defeated the New Haven Blades in six games in the first round, and defeated the Philadelphia Ramblers in seven games, to win the Atlantic City Boardwalk Trophy as playoff champions.

In the 1957–58 season, Charlotte repeated first place in the regular season with 77 points, and a second Walker Cup. In the playoffs, Charlotte defeated the New Haven Blades in seven games in the first round, but lost in the finals to the Washington Presidents in seven games.

In the 1958–59 season, Charlotte dropped to sixth place, and missed the playoffs. The team also ran into financial troubles, which led to the Charlotte Coliseum Authority taking over the team in 1959. A citizen's group raised $25,000 from stockholders, to keep the team on the ice.

In the 1959–60 season, coach Andy Brown moved on, and the EHL split into northern and southern divisions. Evel Knievel tried out with the Clippers in 1959, but decided that a traveling team was not for him. Pete Horeck led the team as a player-coach, the Clippers finished second place in the south, won the first round playoff series in three games versus the Greensboro Generals, and lost to the Johnstown Jets in the second round.

Charlotte Checkers

Eastern Hockey League, 1960–1973

The team was renamed the Charlotte Checkers, resulting from a name-the-team contest. Gordon Tottle became the player-coach, and despite the new name, Charlotte finished fourth place and missed the playoffs in the 1960–61 season. Joe Crozier was named coach in the 1961–62 season, but the team still finished fourth place and missed the playoffs. He returned for the 1962–63 season, and the Checkers placed third in the southern division. In the playoffs, Charlotte upset the second place Knoxville Knights in five games, then lost in five games to the Greensboro Generals in the second round. Turk Broda took over the coaching duties for the 1963–64 season, and led the team to a fourth-place finish in the south, and a first round playoff loss to Greensboro in three games.

Fred Creighton was brought in to coach for the 1964–65 season, beginning eight years at the helm of the Checkers. He improved the team to third place in the south, but the team still lost in the first round to the Nashville Dixie Flyers in three games. Creighton improved the team to 42 wins in the 1965–66 season, and second place in the south. In the playoffs, Charlotte defeated Greensboro  in five games in the first round, then lost in four games straight to Nashville in the second round. Charlotte repeated a second-place finish in the 1966–67 season, then defeated Greensboro in three games in the first round of the playoffs, but lost to Nashville in five games in the second round. The Checkers won 42 games, and earned 93 points in the 1967–68 season, and finished second place in the south. Charlotte defeated Nashville in four games in the first round of the playoffs, and defeated Greensboro in six games in the second round. In the finals, the Checkers were swept in four games by the Clinton Comets.

Charlotte dropped to third place in the 1968–69 season, after many players moved up to higher leagues. The rebuilding effort was made easier by this being first season of an affiliation with the Toronto Maple Leafs. In the playoffs, Charlotte lost in three games to Nashville. The Checkers repeated a third-place finish in the 1969–70 season. Center Tom Trevelyan was named EHL Rookie of the Year for the south division. In the playoffs, Charlotte defeated the Salem Rebels in five games in the first round, then lost to Greensboro in six games in the second round. Creighton led Charlotte to its best results in the 1970–71 season, with 55 wins, and 117 points to finish first overall in the EHL, and win the Walker Cup. Goaltender John Voss led the league in goals against average, and won the George L. Davis Jr. Trophy. In the playoffs, Charlotte defeated Nashville, then Greensboro both in four games, to reach the finals. The Checkers won the Atlantic City Boardwalk Trophy in five games over the New Haven Blades.

In the 1971–72 season, Charlotte switched affiliations to the Buffalo Sabres. Defenceman Don Brennan was voted the EHL Rookie of the Year for the south division, and goaltender Gaye Cooley led the league in goals against average to win the George L. Davis Jr. Trophy. The Checkers repeated the first-place finish and the Walker Cup in the regular season, with 47 wins and 102 points. In the playoffs, Charlotte defeated the St. Petersburg Suns in six games in the first round, and Greensboro in five games in the second round. Creighton and the Checkers won a second consecutive Atlantic City Boardwalk Trophy, defeating the Syracuse Blazers in four games in the finals. Creighton and many players moved on after the two championships, and Charlotte struggled in the 1972–73 season. Jack Wells was named player-coach, and the team finished fourth place in the south, missing the playoffs.

Southern Hockey League, 1973–1977
The four teams in the EHL's Southern Division, including the Checkers, broke away to form the Southern Hockey League (SHL) in 1973. In the new league, Patrick J. Kelly took over coaching duties in all four seasons. Garry Swain led the SHL in scoring with 98 points. Charlotte finished second place in the 1973–74 season, then defeated Greensboro in six games in the first round of the playoffs, but lost the finals in seven games to the Roanoke Valley Rebels.

In the 1974–75 season, Charlotte began secondary affiliations with World Hockey Association teams, and the California Golden Seals, in addition to the existing agreement with Buffalo. Steve Hull led the SHL in scoring with 114 points. The Checkers finished first place in the regular season with 101 points, defeated Roanoke in four games in the first round of the playoffs, and defeated the Hampton Gulls in six games in the finals, to win the Crockett Cup.

In the 1975–76 season, Charlotte repeated first place in the regular season with 94 points. Yvon Dupuis led the SHL with 52 goals scored. In the playoffs, Charlotte defeated Roanoke in six games in the first round, and then won a second consecutive Crockett Cup in five games over Hampton.

The 1976–77 season was cut short when the SHL folded due to financial issues.  The final Checkers game was played on January 30, 1977 against the revived Baltimore Clippers. Charlotte was in third place at that time, and folded along with the league.

Major league affiliations
The Charlotte Checkers were affiliated with National Hockey League teams from 1968 to 1977, and several World Hockey Association teams from 1974 to 1977.

Coaches
Coaches from 1954 to 1977.
† denotes a player/coach

Records
Top scorers from 1956 to 1977.

Notable players
List of notable players for the Baltimore Clippers/Charlotte Rebels (1954–1956), Charlotte Clippers (1956–1960) and Charlotte Checkers (1960–1977)

Doug Adam
Red Armstrong
Michel Belhumeur
Gilles Bilodeau
Yvon Bilodeau
Les Binkley
Bob Blanchet
Dan Brady
Gary Bromley
Ross Brooks
John Brophy
Cummy Burton
Alain Caron
Jacques Caron
Tony Cassolato
Gaye Cooley
Michel Cormier
Normand Cournoyer
Paul Crowley
Bob D'Alvise
Norm Defelice
André Deschamps
Bob Dobek
Rick Foley
Gerard Gibbons
Dave Gilmour
Bob Girard
Dave Given
Frank Golembrosky
John Gould
Bob Graham
Rich Hart
Paul Heaver
Gordon Henry
Greg Hickey
Ken Hicks
André Hinse
Mike Hobin
Pete Horeck
Steve Hull
Ed Humphreys
Ron Hutchinson
Bill Johansen
Rick Jodzio
Mike Keeler
Jean Landry
Jack LeClair
Jack Martin
Terry Martin
Gerry McNamara
Jim McNulty
Gord McRae
Perry Miller
Wayne Morrin
Bob Mowat
John Muckler
Randy Murray
Tim O'Connell
Dan Olesevich
Jean-Luc Phaneuf
Gregg Pilling
Tom Polanic
Tim Regan
Bob Richer
Lorne Rombough
Michel Rouleau
Blaine Rydman
Bob Sauvé
Wayne Schaab
Derek Smith
Chuck Stuart
Daniel Sullivan
Garry Swain
Dave Tataryn
Gord Titcomb
Gordon Tottle
Tom Trevelyan
Willie Trognitz
John Van Horlick
Gilles Villemure
John Voss
Clare Wakshinski
Bob Whidden
Hal Willis
Lynn Zimmerman

Results
Combined season-by-season record for:
 Baltimore Clippers (1954–55)
 Baltimore Clippers / Charlotte Rebels (1955–56)
 Charlotte Clippers (1956–1960)
 Charlotte Checkers (1960–1977)

Note: GP = Games played, W = Wins, L = Losses, T = Ties, Pts = Points, GF = Goals for, GA = Goals against

References

External links
The Eastern Hockey League (1954–1973)
Checkers History album on Flickr

Charlotte Checkers
Eastern Hockey League teams
Ice hockey clubs disestablished in 1977
Ice hockey clubs established in 1956
Southern Hockey League (1973–1977) teams
Ice hockey teams in North Carolina